The Asus ZenFone 9 is an Android smartphone designed, developed, and manufactured by Asus as part of its Asus ZenFone line of smartphones. It was announced on July 28, 2022.

References 

Android (operating system) devices
Asus ZenFone
Mobile phones introduced in 2022
Mobile phones with 8K video recording
Mobile phones with multiple rear cameras
Flagship smartphones